The 1972 Air Force Falcons football team represented the United States Air Force Academy as an independent during the 1971 NCAA University Division football season. Led by 15th-year head coach Ben Martin, the Falcons compiled a record of 6–4 and outscored their opponents 303–183. Air Force played their home games at Falcon Stadium in Colorado Springs, Colorado.

This was first season of competition for the Commander-in-Chief's Trophy, which matched the three military academies annually. The Falcons lost both games, and Army beat Navy in December to take the first title. Previously, Air Force played Navy in even years and Army in odd years.

Schedule

Personnel

Awards and honors
 Orderia Mitchell, 2nd Team All-American (AP)

References

Air Force
Air Force Falcons football seasons
Air Force Falcons football